Sir Charles Williams (1591–1641) was a Welsh politician who sat in the House of Commons from 1621 to 1622 and from 1640 to 1641.

Williams was the son of Sir Rowland Williams of Llangibby. He matriculated at Jesus College, Oxford, on 16 June 1610, aged 19. He became a student of Inner Temple in November 1611. In 1621, Williams was elected Member of Parliament for Monmouthshire. He was knighted on 10 April 1621. In 1627 he was High Sheriff of Monmouthshire. In November 1640, Williams was elected MP for Monmouthshire in the Long Parliament. He sat until his death in 1641.

Williams married firstly Frances Morgan, daughter of Sir William Morgan of Tredegar. He married secondly Anne Trevor, daughter of Sir John Trevor of Plas Teg, Flint. His son Trevor became a baronet.

References

 

1591 births
1641 deaths
High Sheriffs of Monmouthshire
Alumni of Jesus College, Oxford
Members of the Inner Temple
17th-century Welsh politicians
17th-century Welsh lawyers
Members of the Parliament of England (pre-1707) for constituencies in Wales